Michael Joseph Kelley (December 2, 1875 – June 6, 1955) was an American Major League Baseball first baseman. He played one season in the majors with the  Louisville Colonels.  He then forged a 30-year career as a manager in the minor leagues and became a legendary figure in the "Twin Cities" of Minneapolis–St. Paul.

Major League career
Born in Templeton, Massachusetts, Kelley played only one season in the Major Leagues, with the 1899 Louisville Colonels of the National League.  A right-handed hitter and thrower, he appeared in 76 games that season, and he batted .241 with three home runs and had 33 runs batted in.  At the end of the season, the NL shrunk from 12 to eight teams and the Colonels were disbanded.  Many Louisville players were acquired by the surviving Pittsburgh Pirates, but Kelley returned to the minors.

Minor league career
By , he was managing Des Moines in the Western League, and the following season he was named pilot of the St. Paul Saints of the American Association, where he won back-to-back pennants in –.

Apart from 4½ seasons, Kelley managed in the Twin Cities through .  He coached the St. Paul team for nearly 18 seasons (1902–05; August 1908 – 1912; 1915–23), where he won five championships. His  Saints won 115 games, the 1922 team notched 107 victories – each time winning the pennant – and his 1923 club won 111 games while finishing second, two games behind the Kansas City Blues.

Kelley first managed the Minneapolis Millers for one season. At the close of the  season, he purchased the Millers and became their manager. He led the Millers through 1931, but never won a pennant; his highest finish was second, to the Indianapolis Indians, in 1928. His over-all record in his 30 years as a minor league was 2,390  wins and 2,102 losses for a .532 winning percentage.

Post-career
Kelley died at the age of 79 in Minneapolis, and is interred at Lakewood Cemetery.

References

External links

1875 births
1955 deaths
19th-century baseball players
Augusta Kennebecs players
Baseball coaches from Massachusetts
Baseball players from Massachusetts
Baseball coaches from Minnesota
Baseball players from Minneapolis
Des Moines Champs players
Hartford Indians players
Indianapolis Hoosiers (minor league) players
Indianapolis Indians managers
Louisville Colonels players
Major League Baseball first basemen
Minneapolis Millers (baseball) managers
Newport Colts players
Ottawa Wanderers players
People from Templeton, Massachusetts
Rochester Patriots players
Sportspeople from Worcester County, Massachusetts
St. Paul Saints (AA) managers
St. Paul Saints (AA) players
Sports coaches from Minneapolis
Toronto Maple Leafs (International League) players